The New Balance Indoor Grand Prix, formerly known as the Boston Indoor Games, is an annual indoor track and field meet which is held in late January or early February at the Reggie Lewis Track and Athletic Center. It was first held in Roxbury, a neighborhood in Boston, in 1996 and has become one of the foremost events of its type in the United States, alongside the Millrose Games.

History
The competition is part of USA Track and Field's Visa Championship Series and attracts high-caliber athletes, including Olympic and World medalists.  The 2016 edition was part of the inaugural IAAF World Indoor Tour.

Since its inception, a total of six world records have been set at the event. Among them are performances by Ethiopian runner Tirunesh Dibaba, who set a world indoor record over 5000 metres in 2005 and improved that mark in 2007. The Boston Indoor Games has also featured numerous national records and United States all-comers records (the best performances recorded on US soil).

The competition has had a number of title sponsors over its history, including adidas in the early 2000s and Reebok from 2005 to 2010. New Balance became the current title sponsor in 2011. The rights to the event are owned by Global Athletics & Marketing and Mark Wetmore is the meeting director.

At the 2012 meeting, Jenn Suhr broke her own American record in the pole vault, clearing 4.88 m to become the second-highest vaulter of all time.

In 2021, the event was relocated to the Ocean Breeze Athletic Complex in Staten Island, New York as due to the COVID-19 pandemic the Boston venue was serving as a mass vaccination site. The 2023 edition moved to the TRACK at New Balance, a new state-of-the-art indoor track and field facility located in Brighton, Boston.

World records
Over the course of its history, five world records and three world bests have been set at the event.

Meet Records

Men

Women

References

External links
Official website
Boston Indoor Games Records

1996 establishments in Massachusetts
Annual indoor track and field meetings
Annual sporting events in the United States
IAAF Indoor Permit Meetings
World Athletics Indoor Tour
Recurring sporting events established in 1996
Sports competitions in Boston
Track and field competitions in the United States
Track and field in Massachusetts